Hannes Sveijer (born 28 April 2002) is a Swedish football goalkeeper who plays for Sandviken on loan from IK Sirius.

Club career
Benched 7 times for Sirius in 2019, he made his Allsvenskan debut in 2020. In 2020 and 2021 he also spent time on loan at Ettan clubs IFK Luleå, Sollentuna FK and Sandvikens IF.

On 21 February 2022, Sveijer returned to Sandviken on a new loan.

References

2002 births
Living people
Swedish footballers
Association football goalkeepers
IK Sirius Fotboll players
IFK Luleå players
Sollentuna FK players
Sandvikens IF players
Allsvenskan players
Ettan Fotboll players